The BellSouth Senior Classic at Opryland was a golf tournament on the Champions Tour from 1994 to 2003. It was played in Nashville, Tennessee at the Springhouse Golf Club.

In its final year in 2003, the tournament was retitled as the Music City Championship at Gaylord Opryland with a purse of US$1,400,000, of which $210,000 went to the winner.

Winners
Music City Championship at Gaylord Opryland
2003 Jim Ahern

BellSouth Senior Classic at Opryland
2002 Gil Morgan
2001 Sammy Rachels
2000 Hale Irwin
1999 Bruce Fleisher
1998 Isao Aoki
1997 Gil Morgan
1996 Isao Aoki
1995 Jim Dent
1994 Lee Trevino

Source:

References

 

Former PGA Tour Champions events
Golf in Tennessee
Sports competitions in Nashville, Tennessee
Gaylord Hotels